The 8th Oceania Swimming Championships were held 21–26 June 2010, at the Tuanaimato Aquatic Centre in Apia, Samoa. It was the eight edition of the biennial championships, and featured competition in swimming, open water swimming and synchronized swimming. The open water events were swum in the waters off Faleasiu.

Participating countries
Countries with confirmed teams for the 2010 Oceania Swimming Championships were:

 (23)

 (11)

 

 (20)

 (9)
 (7)

Event Schedule

Results

Men

Legend:

Women

Legend:

Overall medal table
Medal standings for the Swimming and Open Water competitions are:

References

Oceania Swimming Championships, 2010
2010 in Samoan sport
Oceania Swimming Championships, 2010
Oceania Swimming Championships
Swimming in Samoa
International sports competitions hosted by Samoa
June 2010 sports events in Oceania